Aedoea is a genus of moth in the subfamily Arctiinae. It contains only one species, Aedoea decreta, which is found in Borneo and Australia.

References

Natural History Museum Lepidoptera generic names catalog

Lithosiina
Monotypic moth genera
Moths of Indonesia
Moths of Australia